Macaranga carolinensis is a species of flowering plant in the family Euphorbiaceae, native to Sulawesi, the Caroline Islands and the Gilbert Islands.

References

carolinensis
Flora of Sulawesi
Flora of the Caroline Islands
Flora of the Gilbert Islands
Plants described in 1901